Stenocrepis duodecimstriata is a species of beetle in the family Carabidae. It is found in the Caribbean,  Guatemala, Mexico, and the United States.

References

Further reading

 
 
 

Harpalinae
Beetles described in 1836
Taxa named by Louis Alexandre Auguste Chevrolat